The Knoop hardness test  is a microhardness test – a test for mechanical hardness used particularly for very brittle materials or thin sheets, where only a small indentation may be made for testing purposes. A pyramidal diamond point is pressed into the polished surface of the test material with a known (often 100g) load, for a specified dwell time, and the resulting indentation is measured using a microscope. The geometry of this indenter is an extended pyramid with the length to width ratio being 7:1 and respective face angles are 172 degrees for the long edge and 130  degrees for the short edge. The depth of the indentation can be approximated as 1/30 of the long dimension. The Knoop hardness HK or KHN is then given by the formula:

where:
L = length of indentation along its long axis
Cp = correction factor related to the shape of the indenter, ideally 0.070279
P = load

HK values are typically in the range from 100 to 1000, when specified in the conventional units of kgf·mm−2.  The SI unit, pascals, are sometimes used instead: 1 kgf·mm−2 = 9.80665 MPa.

The test was developed by Frederick Knoop and colleagues at the National Bureau of Standards (now NIST) of the United States in 1939, and is defined by the ASTM E384 standard.

The advantages of the test are that only a very small sample of material is required, and that it is valid for a wide range of test forces. The main disadvantages are the difficulty of using a microscope to measure the indentation (with an accuracy of 0.5 micrometre), and the time needed to prepare the sample and apply the indenter.

Variables such as load, temperature, and environment, may affect this procedure, which have been examined in detail.

See also 

 Vickers hardness test
 Knoop hardness of ceramics
 Leeb Rebound Hardness Test
 Meyer hardness test

References

External links 
 efunda
 Dental hardness tables

Hardness tests

de:Härte#Härteprüfung nach Knoop